Penner may refer to:

People
 Major Penner (fl. 1718), pirate captain active in the Caribbean
 A.D. Penner (1910–2008), Canadian businessman and politician
 Alden Penner (born 1983), Canadian musical artist
 Alia Penner (born c. 1985), American artist
 Andrew Penner (born 1982), Canadian ice hockey player
 Andrew Penner (musician), Canadian musician and composer
 Barbara Penner (born 1970), architectural historian
 Barry Penner (born 1966), Canadian politician
 Carrie Walton Penner (born 1970), American charter school activist and granddaughter of Walmart founder Sam Walton
 David Penner (1958–2020), Canadian architect
 Dick Penner (born 1936), English professor and songwriter
 Dustin Penner (born 1982), Canadian professional ice hockey player
 Elvin Penner (fl. 2008–2015), Belizean politician
 Evrett Penner (born 2006), Canadian sculptor; see Vancouver International Sculpture Biennale
 Fred Penner (born 1946), Canadian children's entertainer
 Gerry Penner (born 1934), Canadian ice hockey player
 Glen Howard Penner (born 1940), Canadian politician
 Greg Penner (born 1969), American businessman
 Hayley Gene Penner (born 1985), Canadian singer/songwriter
 Keith Penner (born 1933), Canadian public official and former politician
 Ken Penner (1896–1959), Major League Baseball player
 Jack Penner, Canadian politician
 Jacob Penner (1880–1965), Canadian socialist politician
 Jeff Penner (born 1987), Canadian ice hockey player
 Jim Penner (1939–2004), Canadian businessman and politician
 Joe Penner (1904–1941), American vaudeville comedian
 John Penner (1931–2003), Canadian politician
 Jonathan Penner (born 1962), American actor
 Jonathan Penner (writer) (born 1941), American fiction writer
 Julie Penner (born 1976), Canadian violinist
 Michael D. Penner, Canadian lawyer and businessman
 Mike Penner (1957–2009), American sportswriter
 Miloslav Penner (1972–2020), Czech football player
 Norman Penner (1921–2009), Canadian politician
 Robert Penner, American mathematician
 Roland Penner (born 1924), Canadian academic and politician
 Rudolph G. Penner (born 1936), Canadian-American economist
Sarah Penner, American author
 Stanford S. Penner (1921–2016), German-American scientist and engineer
 Vernon Dubois Penner Jr. (born 1939), United States diplomat
 James Penner-Hahn (born 1957), American chemist

Other uses
 Penner River, Andhra Pradesh, India
 Penner School, Winnipeg, Manitoba, Canada
 South Penner River, Tamilnadu, India

See also
 Penner v. United States, a 1970 United States Supreme Court case
 Penne (disambiguation)

Russian Mennonite surnames